Morena is the headquarter city of Morena district in the Indian state of Madhya Pradesh. It is governed by a municipality corporation. It is also the administrative headquarters of the Chambal division.

Geography 
It has an average elevation of 177 metres (580 feet).

Demographics

Literacy was 80.28%; male literacy was 89.08% and female literacy was 70.22%.

Notable people 
 Ram Prasad Bismil, an Indian revolutionary from the village of Barbai.
 Narendra Singh Tomar, Minister in the Indian government.
  Adal Singh Kansana, a former minister in the Madhya Pradesh government.
 Rustam Singh, a former minister in Madhya Pradesh government.
 Ashok Argal,  Mayor of Morena Municipal corporation.
 Paan Singh Tomar, Athlete.

Schools
Schools in the district include:
Triveni High School
Neil World School
J. S. Public School (a day boarding school)
Academic Height Public School
Krishna Convent School Khandoli
Saraswati Shishu Vidya Mandir
Government Excellence Multipurpose Higher Secondary School No. 1, Morena

Transport

Road
Morena is situated on National Highway 3. The roadway connects all the parts of the state and nearby states such as Rajasthan and Uttar Pradesh. The city is situated at the heart of India and can be reached from anywhere in the country through National Highway No. 3. The city has Mofussil (city-to-city) bus services with connections to nearby towns, villages and cities.

Indian Railways 
Morena railway station is connected by train services to all parts of the country. Direct connections by train are available to these cities. Express trains such as the Bhopal Express, Taj Express and Bhopal Shatabdi and many more stop at Morena.

See also
 List of cities in Madhya Pradesh

References 

 
Cities and towns in Morena district
Cities in Madhya Pradesh